Typhoons are an Irish women's cricket team that compete in the Women's Super Series. The team has no geographical base, instead being made up of some of the best players from across Ireland. They are captained by Laura Delany. They won their first Super Series title in 2020.

History
Typhoons were established in 2015 to compete in the Women's Super 3s, a tournament designed to bridge the gap between club cricket and international cricket in Ireland. The team was made up of some of the best players in Irish cricket, and were captained by Elena Tice and coached by Matt Lunson. Typhoons finished bottom of the league in their first season, with two wins from their eight matches. The following season, 2016, Typhoons again finished bottom, this time with just one victory, in their final match against Dragons.

Typhoons saw some improvement in 2017, finishing 2nd in the group with four wins from their ten matches. They fared similarly in 2018 again winning four matches to finish second. In 2019, Typhoons returned to the bottom of the table, picking up 8 points.

In 2020 the tournament was reduced to two teams due to the COVID-19 pandemic, with Typhoons now facing off against Scorchers in eight 50 over matches. The two sides each won 4 matches, with Typhoons just edging out Scorchers for their first title on Net Run Rate. Typhoons bowler Celeste Raack was the leading wicket-taker in the tournament, with 12 victims, with fellow players Orla Prendergast, Rebecca Stokell and captain Laura Delany also putting in strong performances to help their side to the title. The 2021 tournament again included just two sides, with Scorchers and Typhoons now playing for separate 50 over and T20 titles. In June, the Super 50 Cup ended with Typhoons winning just one match, losing the title to Scorchers. In August, they also lost in the T20 Trophy, winning one match out of six. In 2022, the side finished second in the Super 50 Cup and third in the Super 20 Trophy. Typhoons overseas player Robyn Searle, in the final match of the Super 50 Cup, scored the highest score in Super Series history, making 143*.

Players

Current squad
Based on squad announced for the 2022 season. Players in bold have international caps.

Seasons

Women's Super Series

Honours
 Women's Super Series:
 Winners (1): 2020

References

Women's cricket teams in Ireland
Women's Super Series